The 1919  Geneva Covenanters football team was an American football team that represented Geneva College as an independent during the 1919 college football season. Led by third-year head coach Philip Henry Bridenbaugh, the team compiled a record of 4–2–2.

Schedule

References

Geneva
Geneva Golden Tornadoes football seasons
Geneva Covenanters football